Dorothy Summers may refer to:

Dorothy Summers (gymnast), British Olympic gymnast
Dorothy Summers (actress) in It's That Man Again
Dorothy Summers, character in ''1,000 Dollars a Minute